Health Services Academy (HSA) is an institution of the Pakistan's Ministry of Health that imparts public health degree MSPH. It is located in Islamabad adjacent to the National Institute of Health (Pakistan).

References

Medical and health organisations based in Pakistan